The 2016 Hi-Tec Oils Bathurst 6 Hour was an endurance race for Group 3E Series Production Cars and other invited cars. The event, which was staged at the Mount Panorama Circuit, near Bathurst, in New South Wales, Australia, on 27 March 2016, was the first running of the Bathurst 6 Hour.

The race was won by Nathan Morcom and Chaz Mostert, driving a BMW 335i E92.

Class structure 
Cars competed in the following classes:
 Class A1: Extreme Performance (Forced Induction)
 Class A2: Extreme Performance (Naturally Aspirated)
 Class B1: High Performance (Forced Induction)
 Class B2: High Performance (Naturally Aspirated)
 Class C: Performance
 Class D: Production
 Class E: Compact
 Class I: Invitational

Results 

 Class winners are shown in bold text.
 Race time of winning car: 6:04:04.617
 Fastest race lap: 2:28.533, Garth Walden

References

External links
 Hi-Tec Oils Bathurst 6 Hour, Mount Panorama - Bathurst, 25th to 27th March 2016, Specific Bathurst 6 Hour Supplementary Regulations, bathurst6hour.com.au, as archived at web.archive.org
 2016 Hi-Tec Oils Bathurst 6 Hour - Entry List, bathurst6hour.com.au, as archived at web.archive.org
 2016 Sunday Images, bathurst6hour.com.au, as archived at web.archive.org

Motorsport in Bathurst, New South Wales
Hi-Tec Oils Bathurst 6 Hour